Bronte Amelia Arnold Barratt, OAM (born 8 February 1989) is a retired Australian competitive swimmer and Olympic gold medallist.

Career
Born in Brisbane on 8 February 1989, Barratt was coached by John Rodgers at the Albany Creek Swim Club. At the 2006 World Short Course Championships held in Shanghai, she won a gold medal in the women's 4×200-metre freestyle relay and an individual silver medal in the 400-metre freestyle.

In 2007, she broke the oldest record in swimming for Australian women when she broke Tracey Wickham's 29-year-old record in the 400m freestyle.

Barratt competed in the 2008 Olympic Games in the women's 200-metre and 400-metre freestyle events.  She was also part of the women's 4×200-metre freestyle relay team, winning gold in the final, and breaking the now-previous world record by a full six seconds. She swam the second 200 metres after Stephanie Rice, and before Kylie Palmer and Linda Mackenzie. In 2009, she received the Medal of the Order of Australia "For service to sport as a gold medallist at the Beijing 2008 Olympic Games".

Barratt won a bronze medal in the women's 200-metre freestyle at the 2012 Summer Olympics in London, and silver in the  freestyle relay.

At the 2014 Commonwealth Games, she was part of the Australian  freestyle relay team that won gold in a new Games record, along with winning individual bronzes in the 200 and 400 m freestyle.

At the 2016 Summer Olympics, Barratt represented Australia in both the 200m freestyle & 4 × 200 m freestyle relay, winning silver in the  freestyle relay.

See also
 List of Australian records in swimming
 List of Commonwealth Games records in swimming
 List of Olympic medalists in swimming (women)
 List of World Aquatics Championships medalists in swimming (women)
 List of Commonwealth Games medallists in swimming (women)

References

External links
 
 
 
 
 
 
 
 
 
 
 
 

1989 births
Living people
Australian female freestyle swimmers
Olympic swimmers of Australia
Olympic gold medalists for Australia
Olympic silver medalists for Australia
Olympic bronze medalists for Australia
Olympic gold medalists in swimming
Olympic silver medalists in swimming
Olympic bronze medalists in swimming
Swimmers at the 2008 Summer Olympics
Swimmers at the 2012 Summer Olympics
Swimmers at the 2016 Summer Olympics
Medalists at the 2008 Summer Olympics
Medalists at the 2012 Summer Olympics
Medalists at the 2016 Summer Olympics
Commonwealth Games medallists in swimming
Commonwealth Games gold medallists for Australia
Commonwealth Games bronze medallists for Australia
Swimmers at the 2006 Commonwealth Games
Swimmers at the 2010 Commonwealth Games
Swimmers at the 2014 Commonwealth Games
World record setters in swimming
World Aquatics Championships medalists in swimming
Recipients of the Medal of the Order of Australia
Medalists at the FINA World Swimming Championships (25 m)
People educated at St Margaret's Anglican Girls' School
21st-century Australian women
Swimmers from Brisbane
Medallists at the 2006 Commonwealth Games
Medallists at the 2010 Commonwealth Games
Medallists at the 2014 Commonwealth Games